Dvorsky is a surname. Notable people with the surname include:

 Bohumír Dvorský (1902–1976), Czech painter
 George Dvorsky (born 1970), Canadian bioethicist, transhumanist, and futurist
 Jakub Dvorský (born 1978), Czech video game designer
 Miroslav Dvorský (born 1960), Slovak operatic tenor
 Pavlo Dvorsky (born 1953), Ukrainian singer and composer
 Peter Dvorský (born 1951), Slovak operatic tenor
 Peter Dvorsky (1948-2019), Canadian actor
 Robert Dvorsky (born 1948), American politician
 Rudolf Antonín Dvorský (1899–1966), Czechoslovak dancer

See also 
 16241 Dvorsky, main-belt asteroid